Aurantinidin is a water-soluble, red plant dye. It is a member of the class of compounds known as anthocyanidins and is a hydroxy derivative of pelargonidin. Aurantinidin has been reported to occur in Impatiens aurantiaca (Balsaminaceae), and also in cultivars from genus Alstroemeria.

References

Natural dyes
Anthocyanidins
Pyrogallols